The Vai language, also called Vy or Gallinas, is a Mande language spoken by the Vai people, roughly 104,000 in Liberia, and by smaller populations, some 15,500, in Sierra Leone.

Writing system

Vai is noteworthy for being one of the few African languages to have a writing system that is not based on the Latin or Arabic script. This Vai script is a syllabary invented by Momolu Duwalu Bukele around 1833, although dates as early as 1815 have been alleged. The existence of Vai was reported in 1834 by American missionaries in the Missionary Herald of the ABCFM and independently by Rev. Sigismund Wilhelm Koelle, a Sierra Leone agent of the Church Missionary Society of London.

The Vai script was used to print the New Testament in the Vai language, dedicated in 2003.

Phonology
Vai is a tonal language and has 11 vowels and 31 consonants, which are tabulated below.

Vowels

Consonants

 and  occur only in recent loanwords.

Sample Text 
The following is a sample text in Vai of Article 1 of the Universal Declaration of Human Rights.

Vai: ""

IPA: 

English original: "All human beings are born free and equal in dignity and rights. They are endowed with reason and conscience and should act towards one another in a spirit of brotherhood."

See also
 A Grammar of Vai
 Vai syllabary

References

External links
Vai Script workshop
Omniglot entry on Vai script
Smithsonian exhibit on Vai and other African scripts
Universal Declaration of Human Rights in Vai

 
Mande languages
Languages of Liberia